Marc Foucan (born 14 October 1971 in Ermont, France) is a French athlete who specialises in the 400 meters. Foucan competed in the men's 4 x 400 meter relay at the 2000 Summer Olympics.

References 

1971 births
Living people
People from Ermont
French male sprinters
Olympic athletes of France
Athletes (track and field) at the 2000 Summer Olympics
Sportspeople from Val-d'Oise
Mediterranean Games bronze medalists for France
Mediterranean Games medalists in athletics
Athletes (track and field) at the 2001 Mediterranean Games
20th-century French people
21st-century French people